WFRN-FM (104.7 FM) is a radio station licensed to Elkhart, Indiana, United States.  The station airs a format consisting of Contemporary Christian music as well as some Christian talk and teaching and is owned by Progressive Broadcasting System.

History
The station began broadcasting June 10, 1963 as WCMR-FM. On February 1, 1964 its call sign was changed to WXAX.

The station became WFRN on March 26, 1979, the culmination of the dream of Ed Moore for a Contemporary Christian music station. The station was an extension of the AM sister station which has been on the air since 1956 providing nationally recognized Christian programming.

WFRN, along with its sister stations WFRR and WFRI and a network of repeater stations, covers over 30 counties throughout the northern half of Indiana and southern Michigan.

On July 6, 1993, the AM station changed its call sign from WCMR to WFRN. It switched back to WCMR in 2009. WCMR offers a southern gospel music format.

A third station, WGNC-FM "God and Country" 88.5 FM, was added to the WFRN family in January 2013.  WGNC, licensed to Constantine, Michigan and broadcasting with 15,000 watts of power, offers a format of "family-friendly" country music.

Network
The 1995 addition of the 93.7 frequency in Kokomo, Indiana began the building of a network of stations and repeaters that continued through 2008, greatly increasing the station's coverage across northern Indiana and southern Michigan. Most of this growth occurred since May 2003 with the assistance of a group called Friends of Christian Radio.

Stations & their repeaters

 93.7 MHz (WFRR) Walton, Indiana - station
 102.3 Sheridan, Indiana - repeater
 100.1 MHz (WFRI) Winamac, Indiana - station

References

External links

Contemporary Christian radio stations in the United States
Elkhart County, Indiana
FRN-FM
Radio stations established in 1963
1963 establishments in Indiana
FRN-FM